Asha Devi Yadav (born 1966) is an Indian politician with Bharatiya Janata Party. She was elected to the Bihar Legislative Assembly from Danapur (Vidhan Sabha constituency) in 2005, 2010 and 2015.

References

1966 births
Living people
Bihar MLAs 2015–2020
Bihar MLAs 2010–2015
Bihar MLAs 2005–2010
People from Patna district
21st-century Indian women politicians
21st-century Indian politicians